Gorgopis auratilis is a moth of the family Hepialidae. It originates from South Africa.

References

Moths described in 1919
Hepialidae